René Jacquot (born 28 July 1961 in Toul, France) is a former professional boxer and world title holder.

Professional career
Jacquot turned professional in 1983 and captured the WBC Light Middleweight Title in 1989 with an upset win over Donald Curry. He lost the belt in his first defence to John Mugabi, via TKO in the first round. In 1990 he challenged WBC Light Middleweight Title holder Terry Norris, but lost a decision. In his final bout, he took on IBF Light Middleweight Title holder Gianfranco Rosi later that year, but again lost a decision.

Professional boxing record

References

External links

World Boxing Council champions
1961 births
Living people
People from Toul
French male boxers
Sportspeople from Meurthe-et-Moselle
Light-middleweight boxers